Popillia bipunctata, the Yellow Shining Leaf Chafer, is a species of scarab beetles.

Description
Body length 14 mm, smooth and elongate in shape with quite stout black legs. Pronotum is shining black, while elytra are orange.

Distribution
This species has an afrotropical distribution range (East Africa, Ethiopia, Cape, Congo).

References

 Fabricius J.C. (1787) Mantissa insectorum sistens eorum species nuper detectas adiectis characteribus genericis, differentiis specificis, emendationibus, observationibus. Tom.I, Christ.Gottl.Proft., Hafniae :1-348

Rutelinae
Beetles described in 1787